The former French Catholic diocese of Riez existed at least from  fifth century Gaul to the French Revolution. Its see was at Riez, in the modern department of Alpes-de-Haute-Provence.

History

According to an unsupported tradition, the establishment of the Church in this diocese is attributed to the first century and to Eusebius of Eudochius, companion of Lazarus, who had been raised from the dead by Christ himself. A certain Prosper of Reggio of Reggio in Emilia (at the beginning of the fifth century) figures in the history of Riez and was perhaps its bishop.

The first certainly known bishop of Riez is Maximus (433-60), who succeeded Honoratus as Abbot of Lérins and who, in November 439, held a synod at Riez with a view to regularizing the situation of the churches of Southern Gaul, particularly the competing ambitions of the metropolitans of Embrun and Arles. The synod was presided over by Archbishop Hilary of Arles.

His successor, Faustus of Riez (461-93), also Abbot of Lérins, was noted for his writings against Predestinationists; it was to him that Sidonius Apollinaris dedicated his "Carmen Eucharisticum" in gratitude for hospitality received at Riez.

Robert Ceneau, the pulpit orator (1530–32), afterwards Bishop of Avranches, and Cardinal Guido Bentivoglio (1622–25), who was nuncio in France and defender of French interests at Rome, were bishops there.

In 1693 the number of residents in Riez was approximately 6,000, many of whom were Protestants. They were all subjects of the temporal power of the Bishop of Riez. The entire diocese contained 52 named localities, and 60 parishes (including 5 rural priories). In 1751, 3,000 faithful Christians (Catholics) are reported, and the diocese contained 54 parishes.

Bishops

To 1000

 Maximus (434–460)
 Faustus of Riez (461–495?)
 [Didymus (510?)]
 Contumeliosus of Riez (c. 518–533)
 Faustus (II.) (549)
 Emeterius (554)
 Claudianus (573)
 Urbicus (584–600?)
 Claudius (630?–650?)
 Archinric (seventh century)
 Absalon (late seventh century)
 Anthimius (700?)
 Riculfe (789?)
 Rostan (820?)
 Bernaire (840?)
 Rudolf (850?)
 Edoldus (879)
 Gerard (936)
 Almerade (c. 990 – c. 1030?)

1000-1300

 Bertrand (1040–1060?)
 Agelric (1060?)
 Henri (I.) (1094)
 Augier (1096–1139?)
 Fouques (1140)
 Pierre Giraud (1145–1156)
 Henri (II.) (1167–1180)
 Aldebert de Gaubert (1180–1191)
 Bertrand Garcin (1191–1192)
 Imbert (1192–1201?)
 Hugues Raimond (1202–1223)
 Rostan de Sabran (1224–1240)
 Fouques de Caille (1240–1273)
 Mathieu de Lusarches (1273–1288)
 Pierre de Négrel (1288–1306)

1300-1500

 Pierre de Gantelmi (1306–1317)
 Gaillard Saumate (1317)
 Gaillard de Preissac (1318) (Gaillard de Preyssac)
 Pierre des Prés (1318)
 Rossolin (1319–1329)
 Bernard d'Étienne (1329–1330)
 Arnaud Sabatier (1330–1334)
 Geffroi Isnard (1334–1348)
 Jean Joffrevi (1348–1352)
 Pierre Fabri (I.) (1352–1369)
 Jean de Maillac, O.Min. (1370–1396)
 Guillaume Fabri (1396–1413)
 Pierre Fabri II. (1413–1416?)
 Michel de Bouliers (I.) (1416–1441)
 Michel de Bouliers (II.) (1442–1450)
 Robert (1450) (Bishop-elect)
 Jean Fassi (1450–1463)
 Marc Lascaris de Tende (1463–1490)
 Antoine Lascaris de Tende (1490–1523)

1500-suppression

 Thomas Lascaris de Tende (1523–1526)
 Cardinal Christophe Numalius (Numai) (1526–1527) (Administrator)
 François de Dinteville (1527–1530)
 Robert Cénalis (1530–1532)
 Antoine Lascaris de Tende (1532–1546) (second appointment)
 Louis de Bouliers (1546–1550) (Bishop-elect)
 Lancelot de Carle (1550–1568)
 Sede Vacante (1568–1572)
 André d'Ormson (1572–1577) (Bishop-elect)
 Elzéar de Rastel (1577–1597)
 Charles de Saint-Sixte (1599–1614)
 Guillaume Aleaume (1615–1622)
 Cardinal Guido Bentivoglio d'Aragona (1622–1625)
 François de la Fare, O.Minim. (1625–1628)
 Louis Doni d'Attichy (1629–1652)
 Nicolas de Valavoire (1652–1685)
 Jacques Desmarets (1693–1713)
 Balthasar Phelipeaux (1713–1751)
 François de la Tour du Pin (1751–1772)
 François de Clugny (1772–1801)

See also
Catholic Church in France
List of Catholic dioceses in France

Notes

Bibliography

Sources
 pp. 610–611. (Use with caution; obsolete)
  p. 301. (in Latin)
 p. 175.

 p. 219.

Studies
 [an untrustworthy work, loaded with fantasy: see Albanès, pp. 559–564]
 second edition (in French)

 
Riez
1801 disestablishments in France